Til Bettenstaedt (born 20 January 1976) is a former German footballer and currently the manager of BV Cloppenburg II.

Since the 1999–2000 season on he played for 2. Bundesliga team Sportfreunde Siegen, promoted in 2004–05 from the Regionalliga. Previously, he played for the amateur teams of FC Schalke 04, for whom he once appeared within the first team, and SC Verl, where he was situated between 1995 and 1999.

In the crucial promotion season he hit ten goals in 31 appearances.

Bettenstaedt joined BV Cloppenburg in July 2007 after spending eight years at Siegen. In July 2008 he was registered to the second team of Cloppenburg.

References

1976 births
Living people
Sportspeople from Marburg
Association football forwards
German footballers
Germany youth international footballers
VfB Marburg players
FC Schalke 04 players
Sportfreunde Siegen players
Bundesliga players
2. Bundesliga players
Footballers from Hesse